Juan the Landless is a 1975 novel by the Spanish writer Juan Goytisolo. Published by Seix Barral, it marked Goytisolo's return to a Spanish publisher following the death of Francisco Franco. It is the last installment in the Álvaro Mendiola trilogy, which also includes Marks of Identity and Count Julian.

See also
 1975 in literature
 Spanish literature

References

1975 novels
Novels by Juan Goytisolo
Spanish-language novels
20th-century Spanish novels
Seix Barral books